WTWB (1570 AM) is a radio station broadcasting a Regional Mexican radio format. Licensed to Auburndale, Florida, the station serves the Lakeland-Winter Haven section of Central Florida.  The station is currently owned by Carpenter's Home Church, Inc.

By day, WTWB is powered at 5,000 watts.  But 1570 AM is a Mexican clear-channel frequency in which XERF is the dominant Class A station.  So to avoid interference, WTWB greatly reduces power at night to 13 watts.  Programming is also heard on two FM translator stations: W224CF at 92.7 MHz and W238CV at 95.5 MHz, both in Auburndale.

History
On October 10, 1956, the station first signed on the air.  At first it was a daytimer, required to go off the air at night.  For a while, it was a network affiliate of the ABC Entertainment Radio Network.

References

External links
 La Raza 92.7 - 1570

 
 

TWB
News and talk radio stations in the United States
Radio stations established in 1971
Auburndale, Florida
1971 establishments in Florida